The 1976 Fenland District Council election took place on 6 May 1976 to elect members of Fenland District Council in the Isle of Ely, Cambridgeshire, England. This was on the same day as the other local elections. The Conservative Party achieved a majority on the council.

Ward results

Chatteris East

Chatteris North

Chatteris South

Chatteris West

Elm

Leverington

Manea

March East

March North

March West

Newton and Tydd St Giles

Outwell and Upwell

Parson Drove and Wisbech St Mary

Whittlesey Bassenhally

Whittlesey East

Whittlesey Kingsmoor

Wimblington



Wisbech East

Whittlesey Central

Whittlesey South

Whittlesey West



Wisbech North

Wisbech North East

Wisbech South West

References

Fenland District Council elections
Fenland